Led Zeppelin's 1970 United Kingdom Tour was a concert tour of the United Kingdom by the English rock band. The tour commenced on 7 January and concluded on 17 February 1970.

This tour is arguably best known for the band's performance at the Royal Albert Hall on 9 January. According to Led Zeppelin guitarist, Jimmy Page, the Royal Albert hall was "at the time the largest and most prestigious gig in London." The band's manager, Peter Grant, arranged for this performance to be professionally filmed by Peter Whitehead and Stanley Dorfman for a proposed documentary project. However, it was not officially released at the time because the footage was reportedly filmed at the wrong speed. A 40-minute cut was prepared but was deemed by the band to be of unsatisfactory quality.  This cut was released years later as a bootleg. In 2003 the original footage was officially remastered and virtually the entire concert was released on the Led Zeppelin DVD. Audio recordings of two songs from the concert, "We're Gonna Groove" and "I Can't Quit You Baby", had earlier been released on the 1982 album Coda

One concert from this tour, at Edinburgh on 7 February, was postponed for 10 days owing to vocalist Robert Plant suffering a minor car accident, in which he sustained some facial injuries.

For all but one of these concerts, the band did not use any supporting act, although Barclay James Harvest did support them at the Edinburgh Usher Hall gig on 17 February. This would be a trend to continue on subsequent Led Zeppelin concert tours.

Tour set list
The fairly typical set list for the tour was:

"We're Gonna Groove" (King, Bethea)
"I Can't Quit You Baby" (Dixon)
"Dazed and Confused" (Page)
"Heartbreaker" (Bonham, Jones, Page, Plant)
"White Summer"/"Black Mountain Side" (Page)
"Since I've Been Loving You" (Page, Plant, Jones)
"Thank You" (Page, Plant)
"What Is and What Should Never Be" (Page, Plant) (9 January only)  
"Moby Dick" (Bonham)
"How Many More Times" (Bonham, Jones, Page)

Encores (variations of the following list):
"Communication Breakdown" (Bonham, Jones, Page)
"Whole Lotta Love" (Bonham, Dixon, Jones, Page, Plant)
"Bring It On Home" (Dixon, Page, Plant) (On 7 January, 9 January, and 17 February)
"Long Tall Sally" (Little Richard) (On 9 January)
"C'mon Everybody"/"Something Else" (Cochran, Capehart, Sheeley, Cochran) (On 7 January and 9 January)

There were some set list substitutions, variations, and order switches during the tour.

Tour dates

References

External links
Comprehensive archive of known concert appearances by Led Zeppelin (official website)
Led Zeppelin concert setlists
View in Google Earth

Sources
Lewis, Dave and Pallett, Simon (1997) Led Zeppelin: The Concert File, London: Omnibus Press. .

Led Zeppelin concert tours
1970 concert tours
1970 in British music
January 1970 events in the United Kingdom
February 1970 events in the United Kingdom
Concert tours of the United Kingdom